The 1956 Japan Series was the Nippon Professional Baseball (NPB) championship series for the 1956 season. It was the seventh Japan Series and featured the Pacific League champions, the Nishitetsu Lions, against the Central League champions, the Yomiuri Giants.

Summary

Matchups

Game 1
Wednesday, October 10, 1956 – 2:04 pm at Korakuen Stadium in Bunkyō, Tokyo

Game 2
Thursday, October 11, 1956 – 2:05 pm at Korakuen Stadium in Bunkyō, Tokyo

Game 3
Saturday, October 13, 1956 – 2:02 pm at Heiwadai Stadium in Fukuoka, Fukuoka Prefecture

Game 4
Sunday, October 14, 1956 – 2:00 pm at Heiwadai Stadium in Fukuoka, Fukuoka Prefecture

Game 5
Monday, October 15, 1956 – 2:00 pm at Heiwadai Stadium in Fukuoka, Fukuoka Prefecture

Game 6
Wednesday, October 17, 1956 – 2:00 pm at Korakuen Stadium in Bunkyō, Tokyo

See also
1956 World Series

References

Japan Series
Japan Series
Japan Series
Japan series